Jeffrey Alfred Legum (born 1941) is an American philanthropist, investor and former automobile dealer. 

Legum has been successful as an auto dealer, and as an investor.  His investment advice helped build the endowments of both the Park School and the Baltimore Museum of Art.

Early life and education 
He was born in Baltimore in 1941. His father, Leslie Legum, was a developer of large industrial parks, and his mother, Naomi Legum, was the daughter of ice cream manufacturer, L. M. Hendler. Legum attended the University of Pennsylvania, majoring in economics.

Park Circle Motor Company
Upon graduation from the University of Pennsylvania's Wharton School of Business with a B.S. degree in economics in 1963, Legum joined Park Circle Motor Company, which was founded in 1921 by Legum's grandfather. By 1986, he had grown the dealership to the third largest in the country.
Legum's Westminster Motors provided limousines for the 1981 presidential inauguration.

In 1989, Legum sold his Chevrolet-Nissan dealership, retaining Westminster Chevrolet Cadillac, a dealership he had acquired in 1973. He sold Westminster in 1997, ending his involvement in the automobile business.

Investment management and The Park Circle Company
Legum owns and is CEO of The Park Circle Company, DBA Park Circle Investments, a private investment company with interest in Baltimore-related corporations. In 1962, Park Circle Motor Company sold its wholly owned subsidiary, Truck Rental Company of Baltimore, to Avis in return for cash and 10% interest in Avis. In 1966, Park Circle and Lazard Freres sold Avis to ITT Corporation for stock in ITT. This cash and stock became the basis for Park Circle's original stock portfolio, which was managed by Legum.  Legum manages The Park Circle Company hedge fund.

Personal life
In 1968, Legum married the former Harriet Cohn.

Philanthropy
He has been an active supporter of the Park School of Baltimore, the Baltimore Museum of Art, 
and the Johns Hopkins School of Medicine, where he endowed The Jeffrey and Harriet Legum Professorship in Acute Neurological Medicine and The John W. Griffin, MD Professorship in Neurology.

In 2001, Jeffrey and Harriet Legum donated $1.5 million to Johns Hopkins School of Medicine to create a professorship in acute neurological medicine.

In 2003, Legum and his wife donated $3 million to Johns Hopkins to help fund construction of a building which would house both clinical and basic research.

In 2016, the County of Baltimore honored Legum for his philanthropic activities, naming December 10, 2016 as "Jeffrey Alfred Legum Day."

In 2021, Legum gave $110,000 to allow the Baltimore Museum of Art to keep their promise to increase the minimum wage for employees from $13.50 per hour to $15 per hour. Legum also gave money to the Kennedy Center to support the construction of the second building, The REACH.

References 

1941 births
Living people
American automobile salespeople
American philanthropists
American investors
Businesspeople from Baltimore
Wharton School of the University of Pennsylvania alumni
Park School of Baltimore alumni